Macrorrhinia is a genus of snout moths. It was described by William Barnes and James Halliday McDunnough in 1913.

Species
 Macrorrhinia aureofasciella Ragonot, 1887
 Macrorrhinia dryadella (Hulst, 1892)
 Macrorrhinia endonephele (Hampson, 1918)
 Macrorrhinia ochrella (Barnes & McDunnough, 1913)
 Macrorrhinia parvulella (Barnes & McDunnough, 1913)
 Macrorrhinia pinta Landry & Neunzig, 1998

References

Phycitinae